Vidinja Kalyanam is a 1986 Indian Tamil-language thriller film directed by Manivannan, starring Sathyaraj and Jayashree. It was released on 1 November 1986. The film was remade in Kannada as Suryodaya (1993).

Plot 

A death-sentenced inmate escapes prison and seeks asylum in a rich widow's house where she is living with her only daughter. Whether the marriage of her daughter will happen as planned forms the crux of the story.

Cast 
Sathyaraj as "Half Boil" Aarumugam
Jayashree as Divya
Sujatha as  Janaki
Raveendran as Balu
Vijayakumar as Raghunath Divya's Father
Senthil as Balu's Friend
Charle
Chinni Jayanth
Thyagu

Soundtrack 
Music was composed by Ilaiyaraaja.

Reception 
The Indian Express wrote, "Despite the fact that lacks thematic purity [..] The excellent craftsmanship [..] makes you slot it in the above average category."

References

External links 
 

1980s Tamil-language films
1986 films
1986 thriller films
Films directed by Manivannan
Films scored by Ilaiyaraaja
Indian thriller films
Tamil films remade in other languages